This Is Desmond Dekkar is an album by Desmond Dekker released in 1969. For unknown reasons Dekker is credited as "Dekkar" on the album's cover.

Track listing
All songs written by Desmond Dekker.
"007 (Shanty Town)"
"Sabotage"
"Shing a Ling"
"Hey Grandma"
"Beautiful and Dangerous"
"Wise Man"
"Music Like Dirt"
"Rudy Got Soul"
"Unity"
"Mother Pepper"
"It Pays"
"Mother's Young Girl"

Influence

A copy of the album can be seen on the wall of the 'shop' on the sleeve of The Style Council's 1985 single 'Come to Milton Keynes'.

References

1969 albums
Desmond Dekker albums
Albums produced by Leslie Kong
Trojan Records albums